Suna Harini is a 1999 Oriya film directed by Himanshu Parija. The film's  music director was Manmath Misra. The film starring Rachana Banerjee and Siddhanta Mahapatra in the lead roles. The film was a box office success.

Cast
 Suresh Bal
 Rachana Banerjee
 Debu Bose
 Mihir Das
 Pradyumna Lenka
 Siddhanta Mahapatra

References

External links
 

1999 films
1990s Odia-language films